This is the order of battle for Operation Brevity, a World War II battle between the British Commonwealth and the European Axis Powers of Germany and Italy in North Africa between May 15–16, 1941.

British Commonwealth forces
General Officer, Commanding in chief, Middle East Command - General Archibald Wavell

HQ Western Desert Force - Lieutenant-General Noel Beresford-Peirse

Operational command - Brigadier William Gott

The British and Commonwealth force were drawn mainly from the 7th Armoured Division's, 7th Armoured Brigade and 7th Support Group and from the independent 22nd Guards Brigade. They were organised into three groups:

Coast Group
2nd battalion The Rifle Brigade (minus one company)
Mortar support, 3rd battalion Coldstream Guards
5th Australian Anti-tank Battery, 2/2nd Australian Anti-Tank Regiment (2 Pounder Anti Tank guns)
8th Field Regiment, Royal Artillery (25 Pounder Field guns)
22nd Guards Brigade group
1st battalion Durham Light Infantry
2nd battalion Scots Guards
3rd battalion Coldstream Guards
4th Royal Tank Regiment (24 Matilda Mk II Infantry tanks)
One troop, 12th Anti-Tank Battery, 2/3rd Australian Anti-tank Regiment (2 Pounder Anti Tank guns)
7th Armoured Brigade group
A Company, 2nd battalion The Rifle Brigade
2nd Royal Tank Regiment (29 Cruiser tanks)
6th Australian Division Cavalry (~28 Light Tank Mk VIB)
7th Support Group (elements)
11th Hussars(Marmon-Herrington Armoured Cars)
One troop, 12th Anti-Tank Battery, 2/3rd Australian Anti-tank Regiment (2 Pounder Anti Tank guns)

German and Italian forces
Supreme Commander - General Italo Gariboldi

 Afrika Korps - Major General Erwin Rommel
Kampfgruppe von Herff
Reconnaissance Battalion 3
2nd Battalion, Panzer Regiment 5
Motorcycle Battalion 15
Reconnaissance Battalion 33
One Motorised Infantry Battalion, 102 Motorised Division Trento
One AA Battery (88 mm Anti aircraft guns)
Two AA Platoons (20 mm Anti aircraft guns)
Two 105mm leFH Howitzer
Italian Forces
Defending the border
Two Companies, 5th Motorised Infantry Battalion
One Mountain Gun Battery (Cannone da 75/27)
One AT Battery (Cannone da 47/32 M35)
Group Two, 24th artillery regiment
One Field Gun Battery (12 Cannone da 105/28)
Defending Bardia
2nd Battalion, 62nd Infantry Regiment
One AT Battery (Cannone da 47/32 M35)
One AA Battery (20 mm Anti aircraft guns)

Following the British attacks General Rommel ordered the following force, under the command of Lieutenant-Colonel Hans Crammer, to the frontier to defeat the British.

1st Battalion, Panzer Regiment 8
One Flak battery

During the morning of May 16, Rommel ordered further forces to the frontier.

Kampfgrppe von Esebeck
Schuetzen Regiment 200
One battalion
1st Battalion, Panzer Regiment 5
Medium tank Company (minus one platoon)
One Panzerjäger Company
One artillery battalion (minus one battery)

See also

List of orders of battle

Notes

Bibliography

External links
 (however, not all formations on this order of battle actually took part in the fighting)

Brevity, Operation
Brevity, Operation
Brevity, Operation
Brevity, Operation
Brevity, Operation
Brevity, Operation
Brevity
Brevity, Operation
Brevity, Operation
1941 in Egypt
Brevity, Operation